Nadezhda Valeryevna Bazhina (born 29 December 1987) is a Russian diver. She won the 3 m springboard event at the 2010 European Aquatics Championships and at the 2014 European Aquatics Championship.

In the Rio 2016 Olympics, she flopped on her dive after a slip from the board, resulting in a zero score. Bazhina won her first WC medal at the 2017 World Aquatics Championships in Budapest, Hungary. There she won silver losing only to Australian Maddison Keeney.

References

External links 
 
 
 

1987 births
Living people
Russian female divers
Divers at the 2012 Summer Olympics
Divers at the 2016 Summer Olympics
Olympic divers of Russia
Sportspeople from Penza
World Aquatics Championships medalists in diving